

Current listings

|}

Notes

References

 
Wasco County